Cosby Godolphin Trench DL, JP (6 January 1844 – 9 December 1925), styled The Honourable from 1855, was a British soldier and magistrate.

Early life
He was the second son of Frederick Trench, 2nd Baron Ashtown and his first wife Harriet Georgiana Cosby, youngest daughter of Thomas Cosby. His elder brother, Frederick Sydney Charles Trench, was married to Lady Anne Le Poer Trench, and his sister, Harriette Mary Trench, was married to Hon. Frederick Le Poer Trench, both children of William Trench, 3rd Earl of Clancarty and Lady Sarah Juliana Butler (eldest daughter of Somerset Butler, 3rd Earl of Carrick). After his mother's death in 1845, his father married Elizabeth Oliver Gascoigne (the second daughter of Richard Oliver Gascoigne, of Parlington Hall and Mary Turner, a daughter of Sir Charles Turner, 1st Baronet, of Kirkleatham). They spent much of the year at Castle Oliver.

Trench was educated at Eton College and then at Corpus Christi College, Oxford.

Career
He entered the British Army as cornet in the 1st Dragoons in 1863, was promoted to captain in 1871 and retired five years later.

In 1886, he was appointed High Sheriff of Tipperary. He was Justice of the Peace for County Waterford as well as County Tipperary and represented the latter also as Deputy Lieutenant.

Personal life
On 19 June 1873, he married Maria Musgrave, the eldest daughter of Sir Richard Musgrave, 4th Baronet of Tourin and Frances Mary Yates (a daughter of John Ashton Yates MP for Carlow County). Together, they were the parents of four sons:

 Charles Sadleir Musgrave Trench (1874–1958), a Capt. who married Helen Cowley Brown (d. 1937), fifth daughter of Robert Lidwill Brown of Clonboy, in 1914.
 Edward Cosby Trench (1881–1961), who married Evelyn de Courcy Daniell (d. 1965), eldest daughter of Col. de Courcy Daniell, in 1910.
 Clive Newcombe Trench (1884–1964), who married Kathleen Maud Marion MacIvor (d. 1979), second daughter of Maj. Ivar MacIvor, in 1910.
 Hubert Roland Trench (1887–1911), who died unmarried.

Trench died on 9 December 1925. His widow died on 4 November 1938.

Descendants
Through his eldest son, he was a grandfather of Cosby Patrick Musgrave Trench (1915–1983), who married Julia Violetta May Whiting (widow of Frank Louis Whiting and daughter of Frank Porch), in 1956.

Through his third son Clive, he was a grandfather Nigel Clive Cosby Trench, 7th Baron Ashtown, who inherited Cosby's father's barony in 1990 from his first cousin once removed. Lord Ashtowon married Marcelle Cathrine van Kloetinge (d. 1994), the youngest daughter of Johan Jacob Clotterbooke Patyn van Kloetinge, of Zeist, The Netherlands, in 1939. They were the parents of Roderick Nigel Godolphin Trench, 8th Baron Ashtown. After his wife's death in 1994, the 7th Baron married Dorothea Mary Elizabeth (née Minchin) von Pless (the former wife of Hans Heinrich XVII Wilhelm Albert Eduard, 4th Prince of Pless and a daughter of Lt.-Col. Richard George Edward Minchin), in 1997. He was also a grandfather of Hon. Lois Eileen Trench, the wife of Capt. Charles Algernon Mackintosh-Walker (eldest son of Thomas Charles Bruce Mackintosh-Walker of Geddes House), in 1937.

References

External links
 

1844 births
1925 deaths
1st The Royal Dragoons officers
Alumni of Corpus Christi College, Oxford
Deputy Lieutenants of Tipperary
High Sheriffs of Tipperary
People educated at Eton College
People from County Galway
Younger sons of barons
Cosby